Siridhamma College is a school in Labuduwa, Sri Lanka.

History 

Siridhamma College was established to fill the educational needs with the seat of Akmeemana by the Minister of Education Richard Pathirana in 1995. On 6 February 1995 the Prime Minister Sirimavo Bandaranaike opened the school by registering first school child name. The first student was M. G. Kanchana Dilhani Ranasinghe. The school was named Siridhamma College, after the monk, Labuduwe Siridhamma Thero, who was the first monk to graduate from Oxford University.

The school commenced with 90 students and one building with three classes for grade 1. It was subsequently expanded and in 1996, students were enrolled for grade 6 from a Placement test. With those chosen students, three classes for grade 6 were started. with the growth of school it became more popular. The increasing number of students resulted in school expanding with new buildings. On 6 January 1996 a new twostorey building for primary section was opened and construction was started on an additional three story building with a laboratory. The school held its first sport meet in 1996. In 1999 the school established a hostel to accommodate students from outside the area.

The first principal of the school was Mr. P S K Rajapaksha. Mrs. Mala Jayasekara, Miss. Sandya Kodikara, Mrs. Mala Alas, Mrs. Anuja Weerasingha, Mr. Chandana Pandithasekara, Mr. M K Somapala, Mr. A M Wijerathna, Mrs. Nayana kulathilaka were the first staff members of the school. The first Sports meet was held in 1996. This school is glittering among most of the popular National Schools in Sri Lanka. Although it is only a short period after its establishment.

Siridhamma College paid a great attention in teaching English to the students from the very beginning and is proudly the only national school which conducts English medium classes from grade 1.

Principals
The following individuals have served as Principal of Siridhamma College:

Houses

School Houses and their colors
  Sapphire 
  Diamond
  Crystal
  Opal

References

Schools in Galle
Educational institutions established in 1995
1995 establishments in Sri Lanka